Prato della Valle (Prà deła Vałe in Venetian) is a 90,000-square-meter elliptical square in Padova, Italy. It is the largest square in Italy, and one of the largest in Europe. Today, the square is a large space with a green island at the center, l'Isola Memmia, surrounded by a small canal bordered by two rings of statues.

History

Prior to 1635, the area which would come to be known as the "Prato della valle" was largely a featureless expanse of partially swampy terrain just south of the old city walls of Padova. In 1636 a group of Venetian and Veneto notables financed the construction there of a temporary but lavishly appointed theater as a venue for mock battles on horseback. The musical entertainment which served as prologue to the jousting is considered to be the immediate predecessor of the first public opera performances in Venice which began the following year.

In 1767 the square, which  belonged to the monks of Santa Giustina became the public property of the city of Padua. In 1775 Andrea Memmo, whose statue is in the square, decided to reclaim and restructure the entire area. The entire project, which was never fully completed, is represented in a famous copper engraving by Francesco Piranesi from 1785. It seems that Memmo had commissioned this and other representations and kept them on exhibition at the Palazzo Venezia, the headquarters of the Embassy of the Republic in Rome. He did this in order to entice other important figures into financing the construction of statues to decorate the square. The project was approved by Domenico Cerato, professor of architecture at Vicenza and Padova.

The preliminary excavations done to install the plumbing system and reclaim the area were directed by Simone Stratico. These excavations brought to light the remains of an ancient Roman theater. These findings conferred a sense of historical dignity to the initiative, and transformed it into a project of reclamation for its natural public use.
Andrea Memmo resided at Palazzo Angeli, constructed in the 15th century and located in Prato della Valle at an angle with the avenue Umberto I. Today, the monumental palazzo, the property of the city of Padova, hosts the Museum of Precinema, Minici Zotti Collection.

Of particular interest are the benedictine Abbey of Santa Giustina, the neoclassical style Loggia Amulea, and the many interesting palazzi constructed between the 14th and the 18th centuries that surround the square.

Prato della Valle today

Prato della Valle has, from the very beginning, taken its place in the hearts of Padovans who frequently refer to it as Il Prato. At various times it was also known as valley without grass because the number of trees prevented much grass from growing there. Today, however, it is completely covered with grass, and many small trees.

During the 1990s, the Prato went through a period of degradation and neglect, but today it has been restored through reclamation projects and the concern and involvement of the citizens of Padova. During the summer, the square is alive with large numbers of visitors who skate, stroll or study while tanning themselves in the sun. Summer evenings are marked by the presence of teenagers and young adults who chat until the early hours of the morning.

For several years, Prato della Valle has been the seat of the Padovan section of the Festivalbar, and recently it has played host to skating competitions, thanks to the wide asphalted ring which surrounds the square.

Every New Year's Day, and during the Feast of the Annunciation in mid August, parties with music and fireworks take place in the Prato.

The monumental 15th century building of the Palazzo Angeli, belonging to the City of Padova and once the home of Andrea Memmo, hosts the Museum of Precinema – Minici Zotti Collection.

Statues
Today there are 78 statues (40 in the exterior ring and 38 statues in the inner ring), following the original plan there had been 88 statues. They were made from stone of Vicenza between 1775 and 1883 by various artists. 
Among the numerous statues in the square, one represents Andrea Memmo, the patrician Venetian known as the provider of Padova.

Statues on Prato della Valle

The numeration follows the sculpted numbers on the basement of the statues.

See also

References

Bibliography
Pierluigi Petrobelli." L'Ermiona di Pio Enea Obizzi ed i primi spettacoli d'opera venetiani" in La nuova musicologica italiana, Torino, Einaudi, 1965 (Quaderni della rassegna musicale, 3)
Prosdocimi, Aldo. Il Prato della Valle, Padova. 1978.
Stratico, Simone. Dell'antico teatro di Padova, Padova, 1795.
Stefano Zaggia. Isoletta sacra al commercio ed all’arti". Andrea Memmo, Melchiorre Cesarotti e il Prato della Valle come esperimento di riforma del paesaggio urbano, in Melchiorre Cesarotti e le trasformazioni del paesaggio europeo, a cura di F. Finotti, Trieste, EUT, 2010, pp. 112–128. http://hdl.handle.net/10077/4458

Notes

Piazzas in Padua